The 152nd New York State Legislature, consisting of the New York State Senate and the New York State Assembly, met from January 2 to March 28, 1929, during the first year of Franklin D. Roosevelt's governorship, in Albany.

Background
Under the provisions of the New York Constitution of 1894, re-apportioned in 1917, 51 Senators and 150 assemblymen were elected in single-seat districts; senators for a two-year term, assemblymen for a one-year term. The senatorial districts consisted either of one or more entire counties; or a contiguous area within a single county. The counties which were divided into more than one senatorial district were New York (nine districts), Kings (eight), Bronx (three), Erie (three), Monroe (two), Queens (two) and Westchester (two). The Assembly districts were made up of contiguous area, all within the same county.

At this time there were two major political parties: the Republican Party and the Democratic Party. The Socialist Party, the Workers Party and the Socialist Labor Party also nominated tickets.

Elections
The 1928 New York state election was held on November 6. Franklin D. Roosevelt and Herbert H. Lehman, both Democrats, were elected Governor and Lieutenant Governor. Of the other four statewide elective offices, two were carried by Democrats and two by Republicans. The approximate party strength at this election, as expressed by the vote for Governor, was: Democrats 2,130,000; Republicans 2,104,000; Socialists 102,000; Workers 11,000; and Socialist Labor 4,000.

Assemblywoman Rhoda Fox Graves (Rep.), of Gouverneur, a former school teacher who after her marriage became active in women's organisations and politics, was re-elected, and remained the only woman legislator.

Sessions
The Legislature met for the regular session at the State Capitol in Albany on January 2, 1929; and adjourned on March 28.

Joseph A. McGinnies (Rep.) was re-elected Speaker.

John Knight (Rep.) was re-elected Temporary President of the State Senate.

State Senate

Districts

Members

The asterisk (*) denotes members of the previous Legislature who continued in office as members of this Legislature. Samuel H. Hofstadter, Cosmo A. Cilano, Fred J. Slater changed from the Assembly to the Senate.

Note: For brevity, the chairmanships omit the words "...the Committee on (the)..."

Employees
 Clerk: A. Miner Wellman
 Sergeant-at-Arms: Charles R. Hotaling
 Stenographer: John K. Marshall

State Assembly

Assemblymen

Note: For brevity, the chairmanships omit the words "...the Committee on (the)..."

Employees
 Clerk: Fred W. Hammond

Notes

Sources
 Members of the New York Senate (1920s) at Political Graveyard
 Members of the New York Assembly (1920s) at Political Graveyard

152
1929 in New York (state)
New York